Macacos River may refer to two rivers in Brazil:

 Macacos River (Ceará)
 Macacos River (Paraná)

See also 
 Macaco Branco River
 Macaco (disambiguation)